NIROM (Nederlandsch-Indische Radio-Omroep Maatschappij; Dutch East Indies Radio Broadcasting Corporation) was the privately funded territorial broadcaster of the Dutch East Indies. It was one of the precursors of Radio Republik Indonesia.

NIROM was founded in 1928 in Amsterdam but only started broadcasting on 1 April 1934. Starting in Java, it gradually extended its range across the Indonesian archipelago. NIROM operated 27 transmitters by 1939, broadcasting mostly on shortwave.

NIROM was founded by a license fee, which dropped in rate as the number of listeners grew. In 1939, NIROM had 70,000 listeners; by then the license fee was 1.25 East Indies guilders. PHOHI, the shortwave station of the Philips company based in the Netherlands, was one of the stakeholders in the company.

Broadcasting initially was in Dutch only; from 1935 onwards an Oriental Programme was broadcast in local languages.

In 1934 NIROM started publishing a listing magazine, De NIROM-bode, which eventually became the Dutch Indies' most widely circulated publication. From 1935 onwards a bi-weekly magazine Soeara NIROM was published in Malay for non-European listeners, which became a weekly magazine from 1940 onwards.

NIROM broadcasts were occasionally relayed to the Netherlands. On Queen's Day 1935, NIROM provided a live broadcast of speeches by the governor-general B.C. de Jonge and the chairman of the Volksraad, followed by a performance of the popular singer Miss Riboet, who regularly sang for NIROM.

Relays continued after the German invasion of the Netherlands in 1940 through Radio Oranje; for instance, Indonesian politician Haji Agus Salim addressed Dutchmen in the occupied territory in January 1941.

Announcer Bert Garthoff gained fame by concluding NIROM's broadcasts on the day of the surrender to Japan on 8 March 1942 with the words "We're closing now. Farewell, until better days. Long live the Queen." Garthoff later told that the station's employees were told by the Japanese authorities to "carry on as usual". This they did by concluding the broadcasts with the Dutch national anthem, much to the surprise of the listeners. When the Japanese found out about this, they executed three NIROM employees in retaliation.

References 

Dutch East Indies
Radio networks
Radio stations established in 1934
Radio stations disestablished in 1942